Alfred Schmitz Shadd was born in 1870 to Garrison William Shadd and Harriet Poindexter Shadd, his father and mother respectively. He spent his years as an educator, politician, doctor and office holder. He gained his medical certification from the University of Toronto where he graduated with distinction. He died in 1915 of appendicitis.

Career 

Alfred Schmitz Shadd (1870–1915) was an office holder, politician, farmer, journalist, doctor and educator. He was a trained teacher engaged in education within racially segregated schools. Shadd was a doctor in Melfort, Saskatchewan.As a doctor he was diligent and selfless with all types of patients alike. As a famer, he was the pioneer of growing crabapple trees and mixed farming practices in his vicinity. As an educator, he taught at Buxton School and eventaully became the principal of the same school in 1896.

Education 
Shadd enrolled into the University of Toronto medical school for his medical degree. While at the University of Toronto, he was a member of Trinity College. Within that duration of time, he had financial constraints which prevented him from completing his degree in 1896. Following that, he took up a role as a teacher at Kinistino within the province of Saskatchewan to gather funds. He made his way back to the University of Toronto medical school  to complete his degree after a year spent teaching. In 1898, he graduated with honors in his medical degree.

Family and Children 
Alfred Schmitz Shadd was born to Garrison William Shadd and Harriet Poindexter Schmitz. His grandfather, Abraham Doras Schadd was actively involved in the abolitionist movements after he arrived in Canada mid 19th century. Abraham Shadd was also involved helping slaves escape. Alfred Shadd's aunt was called Mary Ann Cary and she was well known in the United States and Canada for her role as an educator in racially segregated schools and racially integrated schools respectively. On the 13th of December 1907 he wedded Jeanette Simpson whom he had two kids with namely Garrsion and Louena.

Politics 
Shadd was a conservative who contested and lost for the position of a territorial candidate in Kinistino in 1902. He contested again for Saskatchewan's first legislature under the Haultain's Provincial Right party in 1905. He lost that contest as well by 52 votes.

Electoral results

1902 election

Death 
Alfred Schmitz Shadd died at the age of 45 years of appendicitis.

See also
 African American history

References

External links
 DR. ALFRED SCHMITZ SHADD (1870-1915)
 Alfred Schmitz Shadd | The Canadian Encyclopedia

1869 births
1915 deaths
Black Canadian politicians
Canadian physicians
Candidates in Saskatchewan provincial elections